Nazihah Hanis (born 11 April 1997 in Perak) is a Malaysian professional squash player. As of February 2018, she was ranked number 101 in the world. She has played in the main draw of numerous professional PSA tournaments.

References

1997 births
Living people
People from Perak
Malaysian people of Malay descent
Malaysian female squash players
21st-century Malaysian women